Thomas Kromann (born 1 June 1987) is a retired Danish tennis player.

Doubles titles

Wins (3)

See also
List of Denmark Davis Cup team representatives

References

External links 
 
 
 

1987 births
Danish male tennis players
Living people
21st-century Danish people